The junior men's downhill is an event at the annual UCI Mountain Bike & Trials World Championships. It is restricted to competitors who are under 19 years of age at the end of the calendar year. It has been held since the inaugural championships in 1990.

Medalists

Medal table

References
UCI Mountain Bike World Championships - Junior Men Dowhill - All podiums 1990-2015 from the Union Cycliste Internationale's website.
2016 Junior men's downhill results

Events at the UCI Mountain Bike & Trials World Championships